Joscelin of Courtenay (or Joscelin I) (died 1131), Prince of Galilee and Lord of Turbessel (1115–1131) and Count of Edessa (1119–1131), ruled over the County of Edessa during its zenith, from 1118 to 1131. Captured twice, Joscelin continued to expand his county, even participating in the Battle of Azaz in 1125. Gravely injured during the collapse of a sapper mine, Joscelin marched his army to relieve the besieged fortress of Kaysun, and died soon after.

Biography
Joscelin was the son of Joscelin I, Lord of Courtenay, and Elizabeth, daughter of Guy I of Montlhéry. He arrived in the Holy Land during the Crusade of 1101, and entered first into the service of his cousin Count Baldwin II of Rethel (in the army of Godfrey of Bouillon), who invested him with the lordship of Turbessel. Later Joscelin would serve in the army of Stephen of Blois. In 1104, he was captured at the Battle of Harran. After passing into the hands of Ilghazi, ruler of Mardin, Joscelin was ransomed for 20,000 dinars in 1107.

By 1113, Joscelin had carved out a semi-autonomous state around Turbessel to the west of the Euphrates, while Baldwin II controlled the territory east of the Euphrates around Edessa itself, which was continually harassed by the Seljuk Turks. That year, Baldwin dispossessed him of Turbessel, while Joscelin travelled to Jerusalem, where he was given the title of Prince of Galilee.

In 1118, Baldwin II succeeded Baldwin I as king of Jerusalem. Despite their former hostility, Joscelin fully endorsed Baldwin II, over the candidacy of Baldwin I's brother Eustace III of Boulogne. Joscelin was rewarded with the County of Edessa.

As count, Joscelin was taken prisoner along with Waleran of Le Puiset, in 1122 near Saruj by Belek Ghazi. Later he was joined in captivity at Kharput, by Baldwin II, king of Jerusalem, who had been captured in April 1123. They were rescued by fifty Armenian soldiers, who disguised themselves as merchants and infiltrated the fortress where the prisoners were kept. They killed the guards and freed the hostages. However, the castle was soon besieged by a large Artuqid force and it was decided that Joscelin should seek assistance. Baldwin stayed in the fortress and after some time it was reclaimed by the Artuqids.

After returning to Edessa he was able to enlarge the territory of the county, and in 1125 he participated in the Battle of Azaz, a Crusader victory against the atabeg of Mosul, who were led by Aq-Sunqur il-Bursuqi.

In 1131, during the siege of a small castle north-east of Aleppo, a sapper's mine collapsed and Joscelin was gravely injured. Following this he received word that emir Gazi Gümüshtigin was besieging the fortress town of Kaysun. When his own son, Joscelin II, refused to attack Gazi, he commanded that his own army should march to Kaysun. Joscelin was borne on a litter, and when Gazi heard that Joscelin's army was approaching, he lifted the siege and retreated. Joscelin won his final battle and died soon after.

Marriage and issue
Joscelin married an Armenian noblewoman named Beatrice, daughter of Constantine I of Armenia. She died in 1119. They had:
Joscelin II, Count of Edessa.

In 1122, Joscelin married Maria, daughter of Richard of Salerno and sister of Roger, regent of the Principality of Antioch.

References

Sources

Year of birth missing
1131 deaths
Counts of Edessa
Princes of Galilee
1st house of Courtenay
Christians of the Crusade of 1101